Kushiel's Mercy is a fantasy novel by American writer  Jacqueline Carey, the final book in her Kushiel's Legacy series. It is the sequel to Kushiel's Justice. Kushiel's Justice follows Kushiel's Scion, which makes Kushiel's Mercy the sixth book in the series, or the third book in the series dubbed the Imriel Trilogy.

Plot summary
Sidonie and Imriel confess their love, causing a national uproar. To mitigate the turmoil and quell the uprising, Queen Ysandre decrees that she won't acknowledge the lovers. To appease the Queen, Imriel embarks on a quest to find his mother and return her to the kingdom where she faces treason charges and execution.

Sources
 Kushiel's Mercy, by Jacqueline Carey

External links
 

2008 American novels
American fantasy novels
Kushiel's Legacy